Arthur Lenne (born 2 May 2001) is a French handball player who plays for Montpellier Handball and the French national handball team.

He is the younger brother of fellow Montpellier player Yanis Lenne.

References

External links
 Arthur Lenne at European Handball Federation
 Arthur Lenne at Ligue nationale de handball

2001 births
Living people
French male handball players
Montpellier Handball players